The Battle of Doberdò took place in August 1916, fought by the Kingdom of Italy and Austria-Hungary. The Austro-Hungarian army was primarily made up of regiments filled with Hungarians and Slovenians. The battle was a part of the Sixth Battle of the Isonzo, and occurred in a strategic area: the most western edge of the Karst Plateau. The Italians had already conquered the lowland area surrounding Monfalcone and Ronchi, and attempted to push over the Karst Plateau to seize control of the major road that linked the city of Trieste, with its important port, to Gorizia. After fierce combat, and sustaining heavy casualties, the Italian forces secured victory, forcing the Austro-Hungarian forces to retreat, and capturing Gorizia.

Battle 
Before the battle, the Austro-Hungarians shifted forces from the Izonzo front to other parts of the war. The lack of Austro-Hungarian soldiers at the region resulted in Italian general Luigi Cadorna deciding to attack the river. The fighting started when on 6 August, the Italian forces, led by general Luigi Capello, began an assault on the Austro-Hungarian positions which guarded the main transport road that lead from the coastal town of Duino to Gorizia. The core focus of this effort was to seize the transport roads, which would secure their southern approach to Gorizia. Capello drafted a plan to divide his forces in half, with one attacking the Austro-Hungarian positions head-on, and the other flanking them to attack the rear of the Austro-Hungarian forces. On the morning of 6 August, the Austro-Hungarian artillery began to shell Italian infantry as they grew closer. In accordance with the plan, four divisions of Italian forces began a frontal assault against the Austro-Hungarian trenches, which resulted in huge casualties to soldiers and officers from heavy machine-gun fire. With the aid of reinforcements, however, the Italian forces managed to force their way through the Austro-Hungarian lines, eventually seizing the village of Doberdò itself. By this time, the Austro-Hungarian forces needed reinforcements desperately in order to prevent further Italian advances. The other portion of the Italian forces commenced their assault from the rear at this time, causing brutal hand-to-hand fighting to occur, with heavy losses on both sides. The now-surrounded Austro-Hungarian army was forced into retreat, ceding control of the severely damaged down to Italy.

Results 
Both armies took heavy losses, with roughly 20,000 men killed or missing. Although they had secured their objective, the losses for the Italians were significant, with roughly 5,000 men dead, as a result of frontal assaults on superior enemy defenses and the Austro-Hungarians' use of chemical weapons. Italian military leaders remained eager to destroy Austro-Hungarian presence in the area, desiring to push to Ljubljana, while their Austro-Hungarian counterparts desired to preserve their men, as they had to fight against both Italy and Russia, giving them two fronts to defend. This desire to preserve their men gave the Austro-Hungarians fewer soldiers with which to defend their borders with Italy and Russia. The battle was strategically significant for Italy, in spite of the numerous losses on both sides. The Italian army gained territory around a front that stretched 20 kilometers.

References

Further reading

Doberdo
Doberdo
Doberdo
1916 in Italy
August 1916 events
World War I crimes by Austria-Hungary
Military operations of World War I involving chemical weapons